The Terrell County Courthouse, in Dawson, Georgia, is a historic courthouse built in 1892.  It was listed on the National Register of Historic Places in 1980.

Its NRHP nomination asserts it is the best exemplification of High Victorian architecture amongst all of Georgia's courthouses.  It is described:The building is asymmetrically massed with a tall pyramidal corner clock tower emphasised by turrets. Huge double Romanesque arches are on a lesser facade tower, The entrance which has a center one story projecting gabled porch is capped by a stepped gable; the side elevation has the same gable in a center entrance bay. Additional turrets - one with an onion dome, others which are helmeted - plus assorted gables, balconies, round arched, rectangular, and even a Palladian window combine in a grand and dramatic manner.

References

Courthouses in Georgia (U.S. state)
National Register of Historic Places in Terrell County, Georgia
Government buildings completed in 1892
Government buildings on the National Register of Historic Places in Georgia (U.S. state)
Victorian architecture in Georgia (U.S. state)
1892 establishments in Georgia (U.S. state)
William H. Parkins buildings